William Sammes may refer to:

William Sammes (politician), mayor of Lincoln, 1515–1516
William Sammes (judge) (died 1646), English judge